The  were a class of eight second-class destroyers of the Imperial Japanese Navy.

Background
The class was originally planned to consist of thirteen vessels, but due to the Washington Naval Treaty, as well as budgetary limitations, the orders for the last four were cancelled in 1922, with the final number being reduced to eight when No.14 was also cancelled. The Wakatake class was the last class to be rated "second class" and all future destroyers were designed larger. It was planned that the Wakatake-class ships should have names, but upon completion they were given numbers. This proved to be extremely unpopular with the crews and was a constant source of confusion in communications, so in 1928, names were assigned.

Design
The Wakatake-class destroyers were essentially slightly modified Momi-class ships with 50 tons additional displacement and a deeper draft to improve handling characteristics in heavy seas, particularly against rolling. Weaponry layout (with the exception of added AA armaments), general arrangement and silhouette were all identical with the Momi class.

As with the Momi class, a number of types of turbine engines were used for propulsion. Asagao was built with Parsons impulse turbines, Yūgao with Escher Wyss & Cie Zoelly turbines, and the remaining vessels with Brown-Curtis turbines.

The armament for the Wakatake-class was identical to that of the Momi class. The main battery consisted of three Type 3 120 mm 45 caliber naval guns in single mounts, with two twin Type 6 torpedo launchers. Anti-aircraft protection was provided by two 7.7mm machine guns. After the start of the Pacific War, one of the Type 3 guns was replaced by two triple-mount Type 96 25-mm cannons, although some vessels had three twin-mounts and two single-mounts instead. The minesweeping gear was replaced by 36 to 48 depth charges with four launchers. Some of the vessels also were fitted with a Type 13 radar.

Operational history
The small displacement of the Wakatake-class limited their utility as fleet escorts, and as with the Momi-class, they were mainly used in Chinese coastal waters, where their shallow draft made them suitable for operations in rivers and coastal waters.

On 15 September 1932,  capsized due to poor stability and sank north of Keelung near Taiwan. In April 1940  was re-rated as Patrol Boat No. 46, with considerably reduced armament and the removal of one boiler, which reduced her speed to only 18 knots.

Of the remaining six units, three (Wakatake, Kuretake, and Sanae) were assigned to Destroyer Division 13  under the Kure Naval District, and patrolled the Seto Inland Sea and the Bungo Strait on antisubmarine patrols. The other three (Asagao, Fuyō and Karukaya) were assigned to Destroyer Division 32 under the Chinkai Guard District, which was assigned to patrol the Tsushima Strait screening maritime traffic in the Tsushima Straits. From 10 April 1942, the 1st Surface Escort Division of the Southwest Area Fleet was created, and Desdivs 13 and 32 were assigned to it to provide protection for convoys against Allied submarine activity. The convoy routes were initially those between Moji, Taiwan, and the Philippines. Later, these routes extended to Singapore, French Indochina, the Netherlands East Indies, and Palau. In the course of this service,  set a record by successfully completing 54 convoy escorts before her loss. Of the six destroyers, four were lost to American submarines, and one to an air attack. Only  survived the war and was finally broken up in 1948.

List of Ships

The five cancelled units were initially to be named Shian (from Kawasaki, Kobe)(later No.14), Omodoka (also from Kawasaki, Kobe)(later No.20), Nadeshiko (from Fujinagata Zosensho, Osaka)(later No.22), Botan (from Uraga Dock Co, Tokyo)(later No.24) and Basho (from Ishikawajima Zosensho, Tokyo)(later No.26).

Naming history
The IJN originally planned that the Wakatake-class ships should have names, but upon completion they were given numbers due to the projected large number of warships the IJN expected to build through the Eight-eight fleet plan. This proved to be extremely unpopular with the crews and was a constant source of confusion in communications. In August 1928, names were assigned, but not the original names that were planned.

References

Notes

Books

 
Collection of writings by Sizuo Fukui Vol.5, Stories of Japanese Destroyers, Kōjinsha (Japan) 1993, 
Model Art Ship Modelling Special No.17, Genealogy of Japanese Destroyers Part-1, Model Art Co. Ltd. (Japan), September 2005, Book code 08734-9
Model Art Extra No.340, Drawings of Imperial Japanese Naval Vessels Part-1, Model Art Co. Ltd. (Japan), October 1989, Book code 08734-10
Daiji Katagiri, Ship Name Chronicles of the Imperial Japanese Navy Combined Fleet, Kōjinsha (Japan), June 1988,

External links

Destroyer classes
 
World War II destroyers of Japan